The Eden microprocessors from VIA Technologies are fifth- and sixth-generation CPUs targeted at the embedded market.

Embedded processors

Eden ESP

"Samuel 2" (150 nm) 
 All models support: MMX, 3DNow!

"Nehemiah" (130 nm) 
 All models support: MMX, SSE, VIA PadLock (AES, RNG)

Eden-N

"Nehemiah" (130 nm) 
 All models support: MMX, SSE, VIA PadLock (AES, RNG)
 VIA PowerSaver supported

Eden

"Esther" (standard-voltage, 90 nm) 
 All models support: MMX, SSE, SSE2, SSE3, NX bit, VIA PadLock (SHA, AES, Montgomery Multiplier, RNG)
 VIA PowerSaver supported with up to 8 ACPI P-states
 Idle power 500 mW

"Esther"  (ultra-low-voltage, 90 nm) 
 All models support: MMX, SSE, SSE2, SSE3, NX bit, VIA PadLock (SHA, AES, Montgomery Multiplier, RNG)
 VIA PowerSaver supported with up to 8 ACPI P-states

Eden X2

"Eden X2"  (40 nm) 
 All models support: MMX, SSE, SSE2, SSE3, x86-64, NX bit, x86 virtualization, VIA PadLock (SHA, AES, Montgomery Multiplier, RNG)
 VIA Eden X2 U4200 supports SSE4.1

Eden C

"Eden C" (28 nm) 
 All models support: MMX, SSE, SSE2, SSE3, SSSE3, SSE4.1, SSE4.2, AVX, AVX2, x86-64, NX bit, VT-x, VIA PadLock (SHA, AES, RNG), VIA PowerSaver

Announced on 13 August 2015 was a VIA embedded PC using a 1.2 GHz VIA Eden X4 5000-series CPU.

 Article
 Forum Post with Photo
 Forum Post with CPU-Z reporting SSE4.2, AVX & AVX2 support – appears to also report AES-NI

References

External links 
 VIA Eden product page
 VIA Processor specification comparison

See also
 List of VIA microprocessors

Eden
VIA